Lemons Forever (foaled May 24, 2003 in Kentucky) is an American Thoroughbred racehorse best known for winning the Grade 1 132nd Kentucky Oaks horse race on May 5, 2006. Her win was the biggest upset in the history of the Oaks.

The Kentucky Oaks had a full field of fourteen fillies, with Lemons Forever posting the highest odds, at 47-1. She trailed throughout the race, only to rally late and win by 1½ lengths.

A $2 bet on Lemons Forever paid $96.20, and a $2 trifecta paid $12,186.60.

Lemons Forever did not make a run for the Triple Tiara of Thoroughbred Racing, the filly equivalent of the Triple Crown, as she did not compete in the second leg of the competition, the Black-Eyed Susan Stakes, on May 19.

After winning the Oaks, Lemons Forever raced ten more times (eight in Grade 1 and Grade 2 races), only winning once in an optional claimer and running 3rd in the Grade 1 Alabama Stakes at Saratoga. She was retired in 2007.

Retirement 
Lemons Forever sold for $2.5 million at the 2007 Keeneland broodmare sale to geologist Charles Fipke. , she has produced five named foals, four of them winners:

Lemons Forever was named 2017 Kentucky Broodmare of the Year for her foals Forever Unbridled and Unbridled Forever.

 Forever Unbridled: Bay filly by Unbridled's Song foaled in 2012, by Unbridled's Song, multiple graded stakes winner including Grade I wins in the 2017 Breeders' Cup Distaff, Apple Blossom Handicap, Beldame Stakes and Personal Ensign Stakes - earnings of over $2 million.  2017 American Champion Older Dirt Female Horse. 
 Unbridled Forever: Bay filly foaled in 2011 by sire Unbridled's Song, ran 3rd in the 2014 Kentucky Oaks and as a 4-year-old won the Gr.1 Ballerina Stakes, earning over $800,000 in her career. 
 Perfect Forever: Chestnut filly foaled in 2009 by sire Perfect Soul, winless in twelve starts
 Forever Perfect: Chestnut colt foaled in 2009 by sire Perfect Soul, two wins in eighteen starts. Stallion in Houston, Ohio. 
 Forever d'Oro: Bay colt foaled in 2013 by top sire Medaglia d'Oro, one win from six starts (as of November 2017). Stakes placed. Competed in 2016 Belmont Stakes.
 Lemons Medaglia: Bay filly foaled in 2016 by Medaglia d'Oro.

References 

2003 racehorse births
Racehorses bred in Kentucky
Racehorses trained in the United States
Kentucky Oaks winners
Kentucky Broodmare of the Year
Thoroughbred family 4-m